The 2020 Elon Phoenix football team represented Elon University in the 2020–21 NCAA Division I FCS football season. They were led by second-year head coach Tony Trisciani and played their home games at Rhodes Stadium. Theyed play as members of the Colonial Athletic Association (CAA).

On July 17, 2020, the Colonial Athletic Association announced that it would not play fall sports due to the COVID-19 pandemic. However, the conference is allowing the option for teams to play as independents for the 2020 season if they still wish to play in the fall.

Previous season

The Phoenix finished the 2019 season 5–6, 4–4 in CAA play to finish tied for fifth place.

Schedule
The CAA released its spring conference schedule on October 27, 2020.

References

Elon
Elon Phoenix football seasons
Elon Phoenix Football